On February 19, 1945, men of the United States Marine Corps invaded the island of Iwo Jima, part of the Volcano Islands chain, in the North Pacific. This invasion, known as Operation Detachment, was a phase of the Pacfic Theatre of World War II. The American goal was to establish multiple airfields that would allow escort fighters to accompany long-range bombers in their attacks on the Japanese home islands, as well as providing a place for damaged bombers to land on the return flight.

The Japanese military was determined to inflict a casualty rate so high that the U.S. government would give up its demand that Japan surrender unconditionally. To this end, the island had been covered with an extremely extensive system of fortifications and fields of fire. The United States Navy subjected the island to an unprecedented bombardment and, according to historian Samuel Eliot Morison, "In no previous operation in the Pacific had naval gunfire support been so effective as at Iwo Jima." Nonetheless, Japanese artillery and machine-gun fire were extremely effective because the underground bunkers were so strong, only a direct hit by a bomb or naval shell could knock one out. Since direct hits were very difficult on well-camouflaged bunkers, many survived and inflicted a huge casualty rate on the Marines.

For the conquest of Iwo Jima, the Marine Corps assigned three divisions, a total of almost 70,000 troops, in stark contrast to the single division tasked with capturing Guadalcanal in August 1942. The conquest of Iwo Jima took five weeks, far beyond the American estimates.

United States

Naval forces 
United States Pacific Fleet
Admiral Chester W. Nimitz HQ at Pearl Harbor
 United States Fifth Fleet
 Admiral Raymond A. Spruance in heavy cruiser Indianapolis
 Joint Expeditionary Force (Task Force 51)
 Vice Admiral Richmond Kelly Turner in amphibious command ship Eldorado
 Amphibious Support Force (Task Force 52)
 Rear Admiral William H.P. Blandy in amphibious command ship Estes
 Attack Force (Task Force 53)
 Rear Admiral Harry W. Hill in amphibious command ship Auburn

Ground forces 

Expeditionary Troops (Task Force 56)
Lieutenant General Holland M. "Howlin' Mad" Smith
 Chief of Staff: Col. Dudley S. Brown
 Personnel officer (G-1): Col. Russell N. Jordahl
 Intelligence officer (G-2): Col. Edmond J. Buckley
 Operations officer (G-3): Col. Kenneth H. Weir
 Logistics officer (G-4): Col. George R. Rowan

 V Amphibious Corps
Major General Harry Schmidt
 Chief of Staff: Brig. Gen. William W. Rogers
 Personnel officer (G-1): Col. David A. Stafford
 Intelligence officer (G-2): Col. Thomas R. Yancey
 Operations officer (G-3): Col. Edward A. Craig
 Logistics officer (G-4): Col. William F. Brown
 8th Marine Field Depot (shore party command): Col. Leland S. Swindler
 Landing Force Air Support Control Unit 1: Col. Vernon E. Megee
 62nd Seabees

Left landing area (Green and Red Beaches):
  5th Marine Division (25,884 officers and enlisted)
 Major General Keller E. Rockey
 Asst. Div. Cmdr.: Brig. Gen. Leo D. Hermle
 Chief of Staff: Col. Ray A. Robinson
 CO HQ Battalion: Maj. John Ayrault, Jr.
 Personnel officer (G-1): Col. John W. Beckett
 Intelligence officer (G-2): Lt. Col. George A. Roll
 Operations officer (G-3): Col. James F. Shaw, Jr.
 Logistics officer (G-4): Col. Earl S. Piper
 Plans officer (G-5): Lt. Col. Frederick H. Dowsett

 Green Beach:
  28th Marine Regiment
 Colonel Harry B. "Harry the Horse" Liversedge
 Exec. Ofc.: Lt. Col. Robert H. Williams
 1st Battalion (Lt. Col. Jackson B. Butterfield)
 2nd Battalion (Lt. Col. Chandler W. Johnson (KIA 2 Mar), Maj. Thomas B. Pearce, Jr.)
 3rd Battalion (Lt. Col. Charles E. Shepard, Jr. (to 14 Mar), Maj. Tolson A. Smoak (to 25 Mar), Lt. Col. Shepard)

 Red Beaches 1 & 2:
  27th Marine Regiment
 Colonel Thomas A. Wornham
 Exec. Ofc.: Col. Louis C. Plain (WIA 19 Feb), Lt. Col. James P. Berkeley)
 1st Battalion (Lt. Col. John A. Butler (KIA 5 Mar), Lt. Col. Justin C. Duryea (WIA 9 Mar), Lt. Col. William H. Tumbleston (WIA 14 Mar)
 2nd Battalion (Maj. John W. Antonelli (WIA 9 Mar), Maj. Gerald F. Russell)
 3rd Battalion (Lt. Col. Donn J. Robertson)

 Reserve:
  26th Marine Regiment
 Colonel Chester B. Graham
 Exec. Ofc.: Col. Lester S. Hamel
 1st Battalion (Lt. Col. Daniel C. Pollock (WIA 19 Mar), Maj. Albert V.K. Gary)
 2nd Battalion (Lt. Col. Joseph P. Sayers (WIA 23 Feb), Maj. Amadeo Rea)
 3rd Battalion (Lt. Col. Tom M. Trotti (KIA 22 Feb), Maj. Richard Fagan)

  13th Marine Regiment (Artillery)
 Colonel James D. Waller
 1st Battalion (Lt. Col. John S. Oldfield) 
 2nd Battalion (Maj. Carl W. Hjerpe) 
 3rd Battalion (Lt. Col. Henry T. Waller) 
 4th Battalion (Maj. James F. Coady)

 Service troops
 Colonel Benjamin W. Gaily
 3rd Amphibian Tractor Battalion (Lt. Col. Sylvester L. Stephan)
 11th Amphibian Tractor Battalion (Lt. Col. Albert J. Roose)
 5th Engineer Battalion (Lt. Col. Clifford H. Shuey)
 5th Medical Battalion (Lt. Cmdr. William W. Ayres, USN)
 5th Motor Transport Battalion (Maj. Arthur F. Torgler, Jr.)
 5th Pioneer Battalion (Maj. Robert S. Riddell)
 5th Service Battalion (Maj. Francis P. Daly (KIA 22 Feb), Maj. Gardelle Lewis (from 26 Feb)) 
 5th Tank Battalion (Lt. Col. William R. Collins)

Right landing area (Yellow and Blue beaches):
  4th Marine Division (24,452 officers and enlisted)
 Major General Clifton B. Cates
 Asst. Div. Cmdr.:  Brig. Gen. Franklin A. Hart
 Chief of Staff: Col. Merton J. Batchelder
 CO HQ Battalion: Col. Bertrand T. Fay
 Personnel officer (G-1): Col. Orin H. Wheeler
 Intelligence officer (G-2): Lt. Col. Gooderham L. McCormick
 Operations officer (G-3): Col. Edwin A. Pollock
 Logistics officer (G-4): Col. Matthew C. Horner

 Yellow Beaches 1 & 2:
  23rd Marine Regiment
 Colonel Walter W. Wensinger
 Exec. Ofc.: Lt. Col. Edward J. Dillon
 1st Battalion (Lt. Col. Ralph Haas (KIA 20 Feb), Lt. Col. Louis B. Blissard)
 2nd Battalion (Maj. Robert H. Davidson)
 3rd Battalion (Maj. James S. Scales)

 Blue Beach 1:
  25th Marine Regiment
 Colonel John R. Lanigan
 Exec. Ofc.: Lt. Col. Clarence J. O'Donnell
 1st Battalion (Lt. Col. Hollis U. Mustain (KIA 21 Feb), Maj. Fenton J. Mee)
 2nd Battalion (Lt. Col. Lewis C. Hudson, Jr. (WIA 20 Feb), Lt. Col. James Taul)
 3rd Battalion (Lt. Col. Justice M. Chambers (WIA 22 Feb), Capt. James C. Headley)

 Reserve:
  24th Marine Regiment
 Colonel Walter I. Jordan
 Exec. Ofc.: Lt. Col. Austin R. Brunelli
 1st Battalion (Maj. Paul S. Treitel (to 8 Mar), Lt. Col. Austin R. Brunelli)
 2nd Battalion (Lt. Col. Richard Rothwell)

   14th Marine Regiment (Artillery)
 Colonel Louis O. DeHaven
 Exec. Ofc.: Lt. Col. Randall M. Victory
 1st Battalion (Maj. John B. Edgar, Jr.)
 2nd Battalion (Maj. Clifford B. Drake)
 3rd Battalion (Lt. Col. Robert E. MacFarlane)
 4th Battalion (Lt. Col. Carl A. Youngdale)

 Service troops
 Lt. Colonel Melvin L. Krulewitch
 5th Amphibian Tractor Battalion (Maj. George L. Shead)
 10th Amphibian Tractor Battalion (Maj. Victor J. Croizat)
 4th Engineer Battalion (Lt. Col. Nelson K. Brown)
 4th Medical Battalion (Cmdr. Reuben L. Sharp, USN)
 4th Motor Transport Battalion (Lt. Col. Ralph L. Schiesswohl)
 4th Pioneer Battalion (Lt. Col. Richard G. Ruby)
 4th Service Battalion (Lt. Col. John F. Fondahl) 
 4th Tank Battalion (Lt. Col. Richard K. Schmidt)

Floating reserve:
  3rd Marine Division (19,597 officers and enlisted)
 Major General Graves B. Erskine
 Asst. Div. Cmdr.:  Brig. Gen. William A. Worton
 Chief of Staff: Col. Robert E. Hogaboom
 CO HQ Battalion: Lt. Col. Jack F. Warner (to 14 Mar), Lt. Col. Carey A. Randall
 Personnel officer (G-1): Maj. Irving R. Kriendler
 Intelligence officer (G-2): Lt. Col. Howard J. Turton
 Operations officer (G-3): Col. Arthur H. Butler
 Logistics officer (G-4): Col. James D. Hittle

 Committed to center sector D+2, attached to 4th Marine Division:
  21st Marine Regiment
 Colonel Hartnoll J. Withers
 Exec. Ofc.: Lt. Col. Eustace R. Smoak
 1st Battalion (Lt. Col. Marlowe C. Williams (WIA 22 Feb), Maj. Clay M. Murray (WIA 22 Feb), Maj. Robert H. Houser)
 2nd Battalion (Lt. Col. Lowell E. English (WIA 2 Mar), Maj. George A. Percy)
 3rd Battalion (Lt. Col. Wendell H. Duplantis)

 Committed D+6:
  9th Marine Regiment
 Colonel Howard N. Kenyon
 Exec. Ofc.: Lt. Col. Paul W. Russell
 1st Battalion (Lt. Col. Carey A. Randall (to 6 Mar), Maj. William T. Glass (to 14 Mar), Lt. Col. Jack F. Warner)
 2nd Battalion (Lt. Col. Robert E. Cushman, Jr.)
 3rd Battalion (Lt. Col. Harold C. Boehm)

  12th Marine Regiment (Artillery)
 Lieutenant Colonel Raymond F. Crist Jr.
 Exec. Ofc.: Lt. Col. Bernard H. Kirk
 1st Battalion (Maj. George B. Thomas)
 2nd Battalion (Lt. Col. William T. Fairbourn)
 3rd Battalion (Lt. Col. Alpha L. Bowser, Jr.)
 4th Battalion (Maj. Joe B. Wallen (to 20 Mar), Lt. Col. Thomas R. Belzer)

 Arrived on March 20 and attached to 3rd Marine Division
  147th Infantry Regiment (Ohio Army National Guard)
 Colonel Robert F. Johnson
 Exec. Ofc.: Lt. Col. Eustace R. Smoak
 1st Battalion 
 2nd Battalion 
 3rd Battalion

 Service troops
 Colonel James O. Brauer (to 6 Mar), Colonel Lewis A. Hohn
 3rd Engineer Battalion (Lt. Col. Nelson K. Brown)
 3rd Medical Battalion (Cmdr. Reuben L. Sharp, USN)
 3rd Motor Transport Battalion (Lt. Col. Ralph L. Schiesswohl)
 3rd Pioneer Battalion (Lt. Col. Richard G. Ruby)
 3rd Tank Battalion (Lt. Col. Richard K. Schmidt)

 Never landed:
  3rd Marine Regiment
 Colonel James A. Stuart

Japan 

Lieut. General Tadamichi Kuribayashi, commanding
Colonel Tadashi Takaishi, chief of staff
21,060 total men under arms
Army
 109th Division
 145th Infantry Regiment
 17th Mixed Infantry Regiment
 26th Tank Regiment
 2nd Mixed Brigade
Navy
 125th Anti-Aircraft Defense Unit
 132nd Anti-Aircraft Defense Unit
 141st Anti-Aircraft Defense Unit
 149th Anti-Aircraft Defense Unit

See also 
Orders of battle involving United States Marine forces in the Pacific Theatre of World War II:

Battle of Guadalcanal order of battle
Battle of Tarawa opposing forces
Battle of Saipan order of battle
Guam (1944) order of battle
Battle of Leyte opposing forces
Battle of Peleliu opposing forces
Okinawa ground order of battle

Sources

Notes

References 

Battle of Iwo Jima
Orders of battle